Samuel A. Turk (1917–2009) was an American-born pulpit rabbi whose writings and issues  and organizational activism made a mark beyond the congregation he served for 40 years.

Credentials 
After attending the Rabbi Jacob Joseph School, he studied at Yeshiva Torah Vodaath under HaRav Shlomo Heiman, zt"l his Rebbi Muvhok for several years and was granted the Semicha  (ordination) Yoreh Yoreh, Yadin Yadin.  Subsequently, he also received Semicha from HaGaon HaRav Moshe Feinstein, zt"l.

His bachelor's degree cum laude was from City College, Master's from NYU, and PhD from Yeshiva University.

Pulpit 
"For 40 years, Rabbi Turk served with distinction as moreh d'asra of the Kingsbridge Center of Israel in Riverdale."

Issues and Organizations 
Rabbi Turk was the first president and a co-founder of the Igud HaRabbonim (Rabbinical Alliance of America).

He was one of the Rabbis who marched in Washington, DC in 1943 to try to save the Jews of Europe who were still alive at a time when this type of public demonstration by clergy was uncommon.

Writings 
His Jewish Press obituary said "To the broader Jewish community, Rabbi Turk is best known as a long-time columnist ... some 1,500 columns spanning three decades ... wide range of topics including halacha, musar, Jewish history, Eretz Yisroel, contemporary Jewish and even secular issues... gained him a wide following." in 1973 he published a book of chidushei torah by the name kerem zvi.

References 

1917 births
2009 deaths
American Haredi rabbis
City College of New York alumni
New York University alumni
Rabbi Jacob Joseph School alumni
Yeshiva University alumni
20th-century American rabbis
21st-century American rabbis